The Detroit-Oxford was an automobile manufactured in Oxford, Michigan by the Detroit-Oxford Motor Car Company from 1905 to 1906.  The car used a two-cylinder, 16 hp boxer engine, that was water-cooled.  The five-seater touring version of the vehicle was door-less.

References
 

Defunct motor vehicle manufacturers of the United States
Motor vehicle manufacturers based in Michigan
Cars powered by boxer engines
Companies based in Oakland County, Michigan